is a railway station on the Karatsu Line operated by JR Kyushu located in Karatsu, Saga Prefecture, Japan.

Lines

Station layout 
The station, which is unstaffed, consists of a side platform serving a single track at grade. There is no station building, only a shelter on the platform for waiting passengers. The track serving the station and a passing line next to it run between the platform and the main road. The platform is accessed either by a level crossing or a footbridge. A bike shed is provided nearby.

Adjacent stations

History 
Japanese National Railways (JNR) opened the station on 1 February 1960 as an additional station on the existing track of the Karatsu Line. With the privatization of JNR on 1 April 1987, control of the station passed to JR Kyushu.

Passenger statistics
In fiscal 2015, there were a total of 12,014 boarding passengers, giving a daily average of 33 passengers.

Surrounding area
National Route 203

References

External links
Honmutabe Station (JR Kyushu)

Railway stations in Saga Prefecture
Stations of Kyushu Railway Company
Karatsu Line
Railway stations in Japan opened in 1935
Railway stations in Japan opened in 1960